The heel is the prominence at the posterior end of the foot.

Heel also may refer to:

 Heel (album), a 2016 album by Dogs of Peace
 Heel (corporation), a homeopathy company
 Heel (professional wrestling)
Heels (TV series), a 2021 TV series named after such wrestlers
 Heel (shoe), the part of the shoe supporting the heel
 High-heeled shoes, also referred to as "heels"
 Heel, Netherlands, a village
 Heel of the hand, at the bottom of the palm
 The neck joint of a guitar
 The end of a loaf of bread
 "Heel", a dog obedience training command
 North Carolina Tar Heels, often known as the "Heels"
 Heeling (sailing), tilting sideways
 "Come with me" command in dog training

See also
 
 Heeling (disambiguation)

it:Tacco